Sergio Fernando Hernández Albrecht (born 27 April 1945) is a Chilean actor. He has performed in more than sixty films since 1971. Due to the coup Hernández left Chile in 1973 and worked in film and theater in Europe. He returned to Chile in 1986.

Selected filmography

References

External links
 

1957 births
Living people
Chilean male film actors
Chilean male telenovela actors
Chilean male television actors
20th-century Chilean male actors
21st-century Chilean male actors
People from Arica